The Mid-South North American Heavyweight Championship was the major singles title in the Mid-South Wrestling Association from 1979 until the promotion became the Universal Wrestling Federation in 1986. The title was retired then in favor of the UWF Heavyweight Championship. The promotion was originally a member of the National Wrestling Alliance referred to as NWA Tri-State, hence the title was originally the Tri-State version of the NWA North American Heavyweight Championship from 1969 to 1979.

Title history

See also
Universal Wrestling Federation
UWF Heavyweight Championship
Georgia Championship Wrestling
Florida Championship Wrestling
GWF North American Heavyweight Championship
NWA North American Heavyweight Championship after 1995

References

Mid-South Wrestling championships
Heavyweight wrestling championships
North American professional wrestling championships